Yoshu may refer to:

 Yōshū, another name for Yamashiro Province.
 Yongzhou, a province in ancient China.

 The Japanese spelling of Yangzhou, a city in Jiangsu Province.

 Yoshū, another name for Iyo Province.